The 1918 Copa de Honor Cousenier was the final match to decide the winner of the Copa de Honor Cousenier, the 13th. edition of the international competition organised by the Argentine and Uruguayan Associations together. The final was contested by Uruguayan club Peñarol and Argentine Club Atlético Independiente. 

The match was held in Parque Pereira stadium in Montevideo, on December 1, 1918. Peñarol defeated Independiente 4–0, winning its first Copa Cousenier trophy.

Qualified teams 

Note

Match details 

|

|}

Notes

References

Club Atlético Independiente matches
Peñarol matches
1918 in Argentine football
1918 in Uruguayan football